The Charleston Advisor is a peer-reviewed publication that reviews proprietary and free Internet resources that libraries license and make available to their patrons.

The journal's tag line is "Critical reviews of web products for informational professionals." It is published quarterly.  Inspiration for the publication came from Katina Strauch, then Head of Technical Services at the College of Charleston. 

The journal has a Readers' Choice Award. It also provides the ccAdvisor online review facility with the magazine Choice.

 The Charleston Advisor was sold by The Charleston Company to science publisher Annual Reviews.

References

External links
 

Publications established in 1999
Library science journals
Quarterly journals
English-language journals
Annual Reviews (publisher) academic journals